R70 may refer to:
 R70 (South Africa), a road
 Aeryon SkyRanger R70, an unmanned aerial vehicle
 Small nucleolar RNA Z152/R70/R12
 Toyota Noah (R70), a minivan